Mahian (also Romanized as Māhīān) is a village in Estarabad Rural District, Kamalan District, Aliabad County, Golestan Province, Iran. At the 2006 census, its population was 25, in 7 families.

References 

Populated places in Aliabad County